The Royal Brunei Air Force (RBAirF) (abbreviation TUDB) is the air force of the sultanate of Brunei Darussalam.  It is headquartered and mainly based at the Royal Brunei Air Force Base, Rimba, within the Brunei International Airport (BIA).  The role of the Royal Brunei Air Force is to defend the national airspace and to provide air policing and surveillance of its land and maritime borders.  , the Royal Brunei Air Force operates twenty manned aircraft and four unmanned aerial vehicles (UAV).

The Air Wing of the Royal Brunei Armed Forces had operated helicopters (the Bell 205) since 1966.

History
The Royal Brunei Air Force was established as the Air Wing of the Royal Brunei Malay Regiment in 1965.  It was first tasked to fly doctors to rural area with two Sikorsky S-55 aircraft, which was operated by pilots from the Worldwide Helicopter Company.  In 1966, the tasks were taken over by British pilots from the Royal Air Force (RAF) operating three RAF Westland Whirlwind helicopters.

In 1967, the unit was renamed as the Helicopter Platoon, and received five Bell 206 Jet Ranger helicopters.  The Air Technical Training School was established in 1980.  In 1981, No. 2 Squadron was established and equipped with six Bölkow BO105 helicopters.  No. 3 Squadron was established in 1982 and equipped with SIAI-Marchetti SF260s.  When Brunei assumed responsibility for its own defence from the United Kingdom in 1984, the Air Wing was expanded.  On 1 October 1991, with the consent of The Sultan, the Air Wing was officially renamed the Royal Brunei Air Force.

No. 4 Squadron was established in 1997, and was equipped with the Blackhawk S-70A helicopters.  No. 5 Squadron was also established in 1997, and was equipped with a CN-235 fixed-wing aeroplane and the Base Defence Squadron.  In the same year, 3 Squadron received the Pilatus PC-7 Mark II training aircraft.  No. 38 Squadron was established in 1999, and is equipped with the Mistral surface-to-air missile.

In 2019, the RBAirF unveiled the Digital Disruptive Pattern BDU in digital grey colours at the 58th anniversary celebration at the Bolkiah Garrison.  As of 28 August 2020, the commander of the Royal Brunei Air Force is Brigadier General (U) Dato Seri Pahlawan Mohd Sharif bin Dato Paduka Haji Ibrahim.

Following an order made in 2020, the RBAirF acquired five Boeing Insitu RQ-21 Blackjack unmanned aerial vehicles (UAV) from the United States in 2021.  They will be used for intelligence, surveillance and reconnaissance (ISR) around Brunei's territorial waters in the South China Sea.  The first was unveiled by the Sultan of Brunei, Hassanal Bolkiah, an event held in June 2021 to mark the 60th anniversary of the Royal Brunei Armed Forces.

A parade was held at the Air Movement Centre (AMC) in celebration of the 55th anniversary on 25 June 2021.  Of note was the introduction of Integrator into the RBAirF, a drone unmanned aerial system (UAS).  In collaboration with the Philippine Air Force (PAF) on 3 December 2021, pilots from the Philippines will carry out their training with the S-70i Blackhawk flight simulator at the Canadian Aviation Electronics (CAE) Brunei Multi-Purpose Training Centre (BMPTC).

The decommissioning ceremony of the RBAirF's Bölkow BO105 fleet was held at the AMC within the Air Force Base, Rimba, on 5 February 2022.  First introduced as a fleet of six helicopters into No. 2 Squadron, Air Wing in 1981, administered and maintained by the Royal Electrical and Mechanical Engineers (REME) from the UK until 1993, this ended 41 years' service of the type as latterly operated by No. 1 Wing, Operations Group.

Organisation
The Royal Brunei Air Force is divided into seven (7) Wings:

The Operation Wing consists of four flying squadrons and two addition units:
No. 1 Squadron is equipped with Bell 214ST helicopters.  1 Sqn previously operated the Bell 212 until their retirement in 2013.  The primary roles of 1 Squadron are for troop lift, casualty evacuation, medical evacuation, fire suppression, VVIP lift, and search and rescue.
No. 2 Squadron was previously equipped with Bölkow BO105 helicopters.  The primary roles of 2 Squadron are to provide flying doctor, reconnaissance, surveillance, close air support, VVIP lift, and search and locate services.
No. 4 Squadron is equipped with Blackhawk S-70A helicopters.  The primary roles of 4 Squadron are special combat squadron operation task, troop lift, casualty evacuation, medical evacuation, fire fighting, VVIP lift, and search and rescue.
No. 5 Squadron is equipped with a CN-235 aircraft.  The primary roles of 5 Squadron are to provide troop-lift, surveillance, and search and locate capabilities.

The Parachute Airborne Tactical Delivery Unit (PATDU) provides jungle rescue team, jungle line resupply, multi rope abseil.  PATDU are also involved in parachute competitions at the regional and international level.
The Fire Unit provides fire and rescue cover of any aircraft during an emergency.

The Air Regiment consists of three squadrons and Technical Training School:
No. 33 Squadron was formerly known as the Air Battery.  33 Squadron is equipped with the Rapier missile launcher.
No. 38 Squadron is equipped with the Mistral missile launcher.
The Base Defence Squadron is responsible for the protection of the Royal Brunei Air Force Base, Rimba, at the Brunei International Airport, and any Forward Operating Base.
The Technical Training School is responsible for producing qualified technicians for Air Regiment, and organising courses related to Air Regiment.

The Logistics Wing consists of three units which are the Engineering Squadron, Supply Squadron, and Technical Equipment Maintenance Department (TEMD).  The role of the Engineering Squadron is to provide and maintain aircraft serviceability for operational use.  The role of Supply Squadron is to provide logistical support and equipment for the personnel.  The role of the TEMD is to provide maintenance for the aircraft.

The Training Wing consists of No. 3 Squadron, which is also known as the Flying Training School (FTS), the Air Technical Training School (ATTS), and the Standard and Evaluation Squadron (STANEVAL).  The Training Wing is responsible for recruiting and training pilots and technicians, as well as preparing pilot instructor courses and flying standards.  3 Squadron is equipped with Bell 206 Jet Ranger helicopters and Pilatus PC-7 Mk.II aircraft.

The Administration Wing consists of the Physical Training Section, Pay Office, Regimental Police, Military Transport, and Civilian Office.

Incidents
A Bell 212 operated by the Royal Brunei Air Force crashed in Kuala Belait on 20 July 2012 with the loss of 12 of the 14 crew on board.  The cause of the accident has yet to be ascertained.  The crash is the worst aviation incident in the history of Brunei.

Equipment

Current inventory 

Armaments for the aircraft consist of M134 Minigun's, FZ rockets and unguided air-to-surface SURA rockets. There have been plans to secure fighter capability by purchasing several BAE Hawk aircraft, but these plans have been delayed on several occasions.  In November 2011, the White House announced that a deal has been secured by Sikorsky to sell 12 UH-60Ms to the Royal Brunei Air Force.  The RBAirF is to acquire three CN235-220 CASA-IPTN CN 235M aircraft for maritime operations.  The C-130J Super Hercules is expected to be delivered to the RBAirF in 2018.  Then RBAirF's commander, Brigadier General Wardi Abdul Latip, stated that the RBAirF was actively working with aerospace company Lockheed Martin to purchase the military transport aircraft, with delivery expected in 2018 or 2019.

To boost Malaysia's security in eastern Sabah from the threats of militants from the southern Philippines, as well as to dispose of older inventory, the Royal Brunei Air Force (RBAirF) transferred four of its S-70A Black Hawk to the Royal Malaysian Air Force.  In 2014, eight Bell 212 helicopters were retired and officially decommissioned from service.

During Royal Brunei Armed Forces diamond jubilee celebration in 2021, a unmanned aerial system (UAS) programme was launched by the Sultan of Brunei, and a RQ-21 Blackjack model was unveiled by a US company, Insitu to the Sultan.  This UAS will be used for maritime security surveillance role.  Moreover, the newly acquired M134D Minigun will be expected to be integrated into the RBAirF later in 2022.

Retired

See also

Royal Brunei Armed Forces
Royal Brunei Navy
Royal Brunei Land Forces
Alap-Alap Formation

References

 
Air Force
Aviation in Brunei
Brunei
Brunei
1991 establishments in Brunei